The chart below represents the current enlisted rank insignia of the United States Air Force.

While all Air Force military personnel are referred to as airmen, it can specifically refer to the pay grades of E-1 through E-4, which are below the level of non-commissioned officers (NCOs). Above the pay grade of E-4 (E-5 through E-9) all ranks fall into the category of NCO and are further subdivided into NCOs (E-5 and E-6) and senior NCOs (E-7 through E-9); the term junior NCO is sometimes used to refer to staff sergeants and technical sergeants (E-5 and E-6).

The Air Force is the only one of the five branches of the United States military where NCO status is now only achieved at the grade of E-5. Formerly, the grade of sergeant was obtained after a time as a senior airman and successful completion of the Air Force NCO School. In all other branches, NCO status can be achieved at the grade of E-4 (a corporal in the Army and Marine Corps, petty officer third class in the Navy and Coast Guard). However, E-4s in the Army with the rank of specialist are not NCOs. The Air Force mirrored the Army from 1976 to 2 May 1991 with an E-4 being either a senior airman wearing three stripes without a star or a sergeant (informally referred to as a "buck sergeant") which was noted by the presence of the central star and considered an NCO. Despite not being an NCO, a senior airman who has completed Airman Leadership School can be a supervisor.

History

Although the United States Air Force came into being as an independent uniformed service with the National Security Act of 1947, it retained the United States Army Air Forces rank structure and corresponding insignia of years past. This rank structure provided for seven enlisted ranks: private, private first class, corporal/technician fifth grade, sergeant/technician fourth grade, staff sergeant/technician third grade, technical sergeant, and master sergeant/first sergeant. Additionally, Air Force personnel were still referred to as "soldiers". During World War II, many USAAF NCOs wore the Army Air Corps branch insignia of the winged propeller underneath their chevrons.

Changes to the rank structure were proposed almost immediately, but did not start occurring until the next year. In late 1947 and early 1948, new chevron designs were tested at Bolling Air Force Base. The style preferred was the one used today, the inverted chevron. Air Force Chief of Staff General Hoyt Vandenberg approved the new chevron on 9 March 1948. A new Air Force "Uxbridge blue" uniform, silver-gray-on-blue-backing stripes, and black leather boots replaced the U.S. Army Air Corps' olive drab uniform, olive drab-on-dark-blue-backing stripes, and russet leather boots in 1949. Old russet leather gear items like boots and holsters were re-dyed and polished black. Air Force personnel were allowed to wear their old World War II-pattern uniforms and rank insignia until July 1952. Recolored Army "hash marks" and overseas service bars were worn on the uniform until 1957.

Although the new chevrons were approved, the titles did not change. Two years passed before General Vandenberg, in February 1950, ordered all enlisted personnel in the Air Force be referred to as "airman" (singular) and "airmen" (plural) rather than "soldiers". A further two years would go by while the enlisted rank structure was studied and changes proposed. The end results finally became effective on 24 April 1952 with the release of a revised Air Force Regulation (AFR) 39–36. This revision changed the names of the enlisted ranks to basic airman, airman third class, airman second class, airman first class (with resultant loss of NCO status that was not restored until 1967), staff sergeant, technical sergeant and master sergeant.

With the new titles came a proposal for new rank insignia for airman third class through airman first class. The proposed insignia had horizontal stripes for airman third class through airman first class while NCOs kept their inverted chevrons. The purpose of the two different types of insignia was to more readily differentiate the airman and NCO tiers while increasing the prestige of the latter. These were not approved at the time of the release of the revised regulation. When they were finally approved by General Vandenberg in December 1952, procurement of these stripes was deferred until approximately June 1955. This change was eventually reversed, on 12 March 1956, by General Vandenberg's successor, General Twining. On 20 September 2021, the United States Space Force released several media graphics depicting the new rank insignia for enlisted personnel. The information sheets described the designs for the enlisted ranks took inspiration from Vandenberg's proposals from 1952, noted as "Vandenberg Stripes".

During his tenure, General Twining also approved the diamond insignia for first sergeants. This became available on 21 September 1955. With this approval, the foundations of the first seven ranks and insignia the Air Force uses today were in place.

The next major change came with the Military Pay Act of 1958. This established the pay grades of E-8 and E-9 but without corresponding rank titles. The titles of senior master sergeant and chief master sergeant were chosen between July and December 1958 after comments were solicited from the major Air Force commands of the day. After much discussion, the insignia for these two ranks were designed by simply adding one and two chevrons to the top of the master sergeant insignia (for E-8 and E-9 respectively), each stripe pointing up.

The rank of basic airman was renamed to airman basic on 5 February 1959, still with no insignia attached.

The next series of changes to Air Force enlisted ranks did not occur for almost eight years. In January 1967 the position of Chief Master Sergeant of the Air Force was created. This position gained its own special insignia, the chief master sergeant chevrons with a wreath encircling the center star. On 1 August 1967 the lower enlisted rank names changed (revised AFR 39–36 on 19 October 1967) renamed to airman third class, airman second class and airman first class to airman, airman first class and sergeant (known unofficially as "buck sergeant" by the NCO ranks at the time) respectively. This returned sergeant to the rank structure as the first step in the NCO tier as a retention move but required achievement of a 5-skill Air Force Specialty Code (AFSC) level. No changes to the respective insignias were made.

In a 30 December 1975, directive the grade of sergeant was split into two separate ranks while retaining the grade of E-4. Senior airman was the last junior enlisted tier rank while sergeant remained the first rank in the NCO tier. The impetus behind this was to laterally promote senior E-4 airmen who were ready for NCO responsibilities but not prepared to take on the role of a staff sergeant. This permitted airmen who had not yet reached the AFSC 5-skill level to achieve the pay grade of E-4. To differentiate the two ranks, the directive changed the silver star in the center of airman, airman first class and senior airman changed to blue while the star on sergeant chevrons remained silver. Having two ranks within one grade mirrored the Army's specialist/corporal division of E-4. This dual role lasted until March 1991, when then Chief of Staff General McPeak terminated the rank of sergeant effective 2 May 1991. This termination was due in part to the manning reductions that occurred in the post–Cold War drawdowns of the early 1990s. The last of the "buck sergeants" would have either been promoted or discharged under High Year Tenure by December 1998.

The year 1991 also saw the last major change to the enlisted rank insignia. In October 1991 General McPeak and Chief Master Sergeant of the Air Force Pfingston announced that the senior NCO tier would have new chevron layouts and that all chevrons would have a white star in the center. The change in senior NCO chevrons was the first since chevrons came into being in 1948. Until that time, master sergeant had been composed of six inverted chevrons (six down) with none pointing up, senior master sergeant six down with one up and chief master sergeant six down with two up. The new layout changed the insignia to the current layout (see chart above). The second change, changing the star color to white, was actually two changes in one. It added a star to the airman through senior airman rank insignias where there had been none since 1 June 1976 (the blue star carried by these chevrons was the same color as the blue in the stripes giving the impression that the star was not there) and changing the silver star on the NCO and senior NCO chevrons to white.

In November 1998, the duty position of senior enlisted advisor was changed to command chief master sergeant. Along with the change, the addition of a star in the empty blue area between the chevrons was added to denote those holding this position.

In November 2004, the Chief Master Sergeant of the Air Force insignia was updated to include the Great Seal of the United States with a white star on either side. These additions were placed in the empty blue area between the chevrons.

In December 2019, the duty position of senior enlisted advisor to the chairman (SEAC) was given a unique rank insignia. Air Force Chief Master Sgt. Ramon Colon-Lopez, the fourth senior enlisted advisor to the chairman, is to be the first to wear the new Air Force version of the insignia.

Timeline of changes
This table shows changes in insignia, from 1947 until the present.

Civil Air Patrol
Former military enlisted personnel from E-4 up may choose to retain their grade as senior members in the Civil Air Patrol, with grades E-5 (CAP staff sergeant) through E-9 (CAP chief master sergeant) available. Former CAP national commander, Major Gen Carr, unveiled plans to restructure the CAP NCO program to allow individuals to "enlist" as NCOs and progress through a specific professional development program. According to an air force article on the subject, "The current design of the NCO corps in the CAP only allows former active-duty NCOs to be a part of the corps, with no upgrade training for promotion within the ranks. The newly signed corps structure will mirror the Air Force NCO force structure with an established process to promote and develop NCOs." By 2018 a professional development and promotion pathway was in place for former military enlisted personnel who joined CAP at their previous rank.

See also
 United States Air Force officer rank insignia
 United States Air Force Warrant officer rank insignia

Explanatory notes

References

External links
 Air Force Instruction 36-2903, Dress and Personal Appearance of Air Force Personnel

Rank insignia
Military insignia